FK Kabel is a football club based in Novi Sad, Vojvodina, Serbia. They compete in the Serbian League Vojvodina, the third tier of the national league system.

History
The club was founded in 1932 by the workers of Novosadska fabrika kabela (NFK), a local cable factory. They competed in the local leagues of Novi Sad over the next few years. In 1945, following the end of World War II, the club was refounded by the factory's workers and given its original name. The name was briefly changed to Metalac in 1947, but reverted after only a few months.

In 1975, the club reached the Vojvodina League for the first time ever. They remained in the third tier of Yugoslav football for two seasons. The club would return to the Vojvodina League on two more occasions in 1978 and 1983. They eventually finished as champions of the third tier in the 1986–87 season to reach the Yugoslav Second League (Group West). However, the club suffered relegation after just one season and continued competing in the newly formed Yugoslav Inter-Republic League (Group North).

Following the breakup of Yugoslavia, the club placed third in the NATO bombing-shortened 1998–99 Serbian League Vojvodina and gained promotion to the Second League of FR Yugoslavia (Group North). They spent three consecutive seasons in the second tier, before being relegated in 2002. Subsequently, the club competed in the Serbian League Vojvodina for two seasons, before suffering relegation to the Vojvodina League West in 2004.

After finishing as runners-up in the 2016–17 Vojvodina League South, the club won the title in the next season and took promotion to the Serbian League Vojvodina. They subsequently placed first in the third tier and gained promotion to the Serbian First League in 2019.

Honours
Vojvodina League / Serbian League Vojvodina (Tier 3)
 1986–87 / 2018–19
Novi Sad-Syrmia Zone League / Vojvodina League South (Tier 4)
 1973–74, 1974–75, 1977–78, 1982–83 / 2017–18

Seasons

Notable players
This is a list of players who have played at full international level.
  Željko Brkić
  Dimitrije Injac
  Igor Bogdanović
For a list of all FK Kabel players with a Wikipedia article, see :Category:FK Kabel players.

Managerial history

References

External links
 Club page at Srbijasport

1932 establishments in Serbia
Association football clubs established in 1932
Football clubs in Yugoslavia
Football clubs in Serbia
Football clubs in Vojvodina
Football clubs in Novi Sad